Charles Rumford Walker Sr. (February 13, 1852 – April 22, 1922) was a prominent New Hampshire physician and politician.

Biography
He was born on February 13, 1852, in Concord, New Hampshire. His grandfather was Nathaniel Gookin Upham, a justice of the New Hampshire Supreme Court.

Walker was educated at Phillips Exeter Academy, Yale University and Harvard Medical School. He was the president of the New Hampshire Medical Society in 1899. He was among the founding physicians of Margaret Pillsbury Hospital in Concord, New Hampshire. A Republican, he was a member of the New Hampshire State Legislature in 1894.

He died in Concord on April 22, 1922.

See also
Upham-Walker House

References

1852 births
1922 deaths
New Hampshire Republicans
Yale University alumni
Harvard Medical School alumni
Physicians from New Hampshire